Koningin Juliana may refer to -

Juliana of the Netherlands (1909-2004), Queen of the Netherlands 1948–80.
, a ferry in service 1969-84